Big Brother Maktspelet, also known as Big Brother 2015, is the tenth season of the Swedish Big Brother. Adam Alsing is going to host of the show once again. Ten players will now be selected out of a colorful and large group of candidates to meet the tough challenges and strategic power game that awaits. Ten strong characters with interesting background stories to share or hide. An all-powerful Big Brother who see, hear, know and control everything. Also, a few Norwegian housemates would also be included on the cast.

This season started on 11 October 2015. This is the first Swedish Big Brother season to include new rules of Power player like in the British version. This will also be the shortest season with 70 days inside the house.

A Power Player nominated every week - a coveted title that can mean a great position of power, a possibility to control the game.

Housemates 
On Day 1, ten housemates entered the House. On Day 3, three more housemates entered. On Day 7, six more housemates entered.

Andreas, Anna-Lisa and Sara are from the Swedish version of the British show Ex on the Beach Sverige.

Power Player
The Power Player is responsible for making important decisions in the house regarding nominations. The Power Player is immune from being nominated for the week they hold the title, but they can still nominate others.
 On Day 1, Lina was voted as the Power Player by the public just moments after entering the house. Her first big decision was to decide which housemate should be punished, and which should be rewarded based on first impressions. Respectively, she punished Patricia and rewarded Alex. On Day 2, she had to choose which of her housemates should be the first finalist from the season. She chose Christian. 
 On Day 5, Lina chose Troy as the Power Player. He was told that he would have the power to choose two housemates to be evicted. He chose Alex and Karin on Day 6.

 Colour key
 Won the title of Power Player
 Eligible to become Power Player
 Not in the house at the time when the Power Player was decided
 Was not eligible to become Power Player

Nominations table 

Undisclosed Nominations are represented by "N/A"

Notes

References

External links 
bigbrother.se
BigBrotherBlogg - Big Brother 2015 Ambassador
Big Brother Houseguards

2015 Swedish television seasons
7